The Spaulding House is a historic house on Main Street in Norridgewock, Maine.  Built about 1835 by one of the town's early settlers, it is a fine local example of Greek Revival executed in brick.  The house was listed on the National Register of Historic Places in 1978.

Description and history
The Spaulding House is set on the north side of Main Street, near Norridgewock's town center.  It is a -story brick building, with a front-facing gable roof and a rear wood-frame ell, all set on a granite foundation.  The south-facing front facade is three bays wide, with the entrance recessed in the right bay.  Windows on the first floor are triple-hung sashes, with granite sills and lintels; there are also two windows at the attic level.  On the sides of the house the windows are set in slightly recessed panels, a feature more typically found on industrial construction.  A shed-roof dormer is set on the east side of the roof.  The ell includes two normal doors and a 20th-century garage door.

Otis Spaulding, one of Norridgewock's early white settlers, came to the area in 1815, and probably built what is now the ell of this house around that time.  The main house dates to about 1835, and was held by Spaulding's descendants until 1921.

See also
National Register of Historic Places listings in Somerset County, Maine

References

Houses on the National Register of Historic Places in Maine
Greek Revival houses in Maine
Houses completed in 1835
Houses in Somerset County, Maine
Norridgewock, Maine
National Register of Historic Places in Somerset County, Maine